"The Night Paddy Murphy Died" is a popular Newfoundland folk song regarding the death of a man and the antics of his friends as they engage in a traditional Irish wake. It is often attributed to Johnny Burke (1851–1930), a popular St. John's balladeer; however, there is no record of Johnny Burke having written this song. One of the earliest known recordings of the song is by Irish-American immigrants, the Flanagan Brothers, on October 25, 1926 in New York City for the Victor label.

The song has been recorded by numerous artists, including Ryan's Fancy on their 1973 album Newfoundland Drinking Songs, The Irish Brigade on their 1991 album Are You Ready For This?, Darby O'Gill on their 2002 album Waitin' for a Ride, Drunk & Disorderly on their album Home By Way of the Gutter, Great Big Sea on their 1997 and 2000 albums Play and Road Rage, Fiddler's Green on their 2007 album Drive Me Mad!, by the Washington Square Harp and Shamrock Orchestra on their 2011 album Since Maggie Dooley Learned the Hooley Hooley and by Paddy Murphy on the 2012 album Dog's Dinner.

The song was also covered by The Mudmen on their 2012 album Donegal Danny.

Russell Crowe sang along to the song in the 2009 film 'State of Play'.

See also

 List of Newfoundland songs

References

External links
 Lyrics

Newfoundland and Labrador folk songs
Songs about death
Canadian comedy songs
Irish-Canadian culture in Newfoundland and Labrador
Songs written by Johnny Burke (Newfoundland songwriter)
Year of song unknown
Songs of the Irish diaspora
Canadian folk songs